Radu Albot (born 11 November 1989) is a Moldovan professional tennis player. He is the first player from Moldova to win ATP singles (2019 Delray Beach Open) and doubles (2015 Istanbul Open) titles.

Albot has won one ATP World Tour singles and one doubles title, 7 singles and 10 doubles Challenger titles in his career, as well as 14 singles and 7 doubles Futures titles. He has been a regular member of the Moldovan Davis Cup team since 2007 and holds his country's records for the most singles wins (28) and total wins (41).

His ATP singles ranking of No. 99 on August 3, 2015, made him the first Moldovan to break into the top 100. Albot achieved a career high ranking of No. 39 on August 5, 2019. He finished in the top 100 in the year-end rankings for five years (2016, 2017, 2018, 2019, 2020). His year-end career high was in 2019 when he finished at No. 46.

Personal life 
Albot became a father on 19 April 2020, after his girlfriend Doina, gave birth to daughter Adeline.

Tennis career

2013–16: Historic maiden ATP title
Radu Albot has achieved many firsts for a Moldovan professional tennis player. In September 2013 he won the ATP Challenger event in Fergana, Uzbekistan, becoming the first player from his country to win an ATP Challenger tournament. At the 2014 US Open, he won three straight matches in the men's qualifying tournament to gain a berth in the main draw, becoming the first Moldovan to play in the main draw of a Grand Slam Tournament.

In May 2015, Albot teamed up with Dušan Lajović to win the doubles title at the inaugural 2015 Istanbul Open, becoming the first Moldovan to win an ATP Tour level event. In October 2015, Albot together with his doubles partner František Čermák managed to reach the 2015 Kremlin Cup final, being defeated by Andrey Rublev and Dmitry Tursunov in the decisive set. In June 2016, he qualified for the 2016 Wimbledon Championships and won his first Grand Slam match in 4 attempts, defeating Gastão Elias in the first round.

2017–19: First ATP singles title and first Grand Slam doubles semifinal  
In June 2017, Radu Albot reached the quarter-finals of the 2017 Antalya Open beating João Sousa and Paolo Lorenzi, before losing to Andreas Seppi in straight sets. In the same year, he played for the first time in the main draw of all four Grand Slam tournaments. He received direct entry into the Australian Open, French Open and Wimbledon tournaments. Albot qualified for the 2015 US Open tournament and won two main draw matches before being defeated by Sam Querrey in the third round, his best singles finish at a Grand Slam to date. He equalled this achievement at the 2018 Wimbledon Championships, defeating Pablo Carreno Busta in the first round before eventually losing in the third round to John Isner.

In February 2018, Radu Albot reached the quarterfinals of the 2018 New York Open, winning matches against Bjorn Fratangelo and John Isner, but being eliminated by Kei Nishikori in the decisive third set. In September 2018, he reached his first ATP Tour level singles semifinals at the 2018 Moselle Open where he lost against the eventual tournament champion, Gilles Simon.

At the 2018 US Open, he and partner Malek Jaziri reached the doubles semifinals.

In early February 2019, Albot reached the semifinals of the 2019 Open Sud de France tournament, beating Philipp Kohlschreiber, Ernests Gulbis and Marcos Baghdatis, before losing to the eventual tournament champion Jo-Wilfried Tsonga. In late February 2019, he won the 2019 Delray Beach Open, making history as the first Moldovan to win an ATP singles title, knocking out Ivo Karlović, Nick Kyrgios, Steve Johnson and Mackenzie McDonald. In the final he defeated Dan Evans of Great Britain in a closely fought three-set match. In May 2019, Albot reached the 2019 Geneva Open semifinal losing in the penultimate round against Nicolás Jarry. In August, 2019 he reached his third semifinal of the year at the 2019 Los Cabos Open, losing to Taylor Fritz. His three victories in the tournament put him at a total of 25 for the year, his most ATP tour wins in a season.

2020–21: Inaugural ATP Cup, Australian Open third round, struggles, out of top 100
In January 2020, Albot participated in the Inaugural 2020 ATP Cup in the Group stage as a member of the Moldovan team.

Albot reached the third round at the 2021 Australian Open for the first time at this Major where he defeated World No. 13 Roberto Bautista Agut en route before losing to 24th seed Casper Ruud. In February, seeded sixth he made his first semifinal in 19 months and of the year at the 2021 Singapore Tennis Open where he lost to Alexander Bublik.
After eight first rounds losses he dropped out of the top 100 on 2 August 2021. 

He finished with a 6-15 ATP win–loss record for the 2021 season, ranked No. 125.

2022–23: Consecutive Major third round, First ATP semifinal in two years, back to Masters and top 100
Albot reached the third round at the 2022 Australian Open as a qualifier, defeating Australian wildcard Aleksandar Vukic.
He won the title at the 2022 Istanbul Challenger defeating Lukas Rosol. As a result he moved back into the 100 to No. 92 on 19 September 2022.

He finished the 2022 season ranked No. 103.

He lost in the first round of the qualifications at the 2023 Australian Open to fellow qualifier Brandon Holt.
At the 2023 Delray Beach Open he reached his first ATP semifinal since February 2021 by defeating second seeded Tommy Paul, which was his seventh top-20 career win. In the semifinals, he lost against fourth seed Miomir Kecmanovic. As a result he returned to the top 100 at No. 99 on 20 February 2023.

He entered the main draw of the 2023 BNP Paribas Open as a lucky loser into the second round replacing 15th seed Pablo Carreno Busta who withdrew in the last minute.

Performance timelines

Singles
Current through the 2023 Australian Open.

Doubles

ATP career finals

Singles: 1 (1 title)

Doubles: 2 (1 title, 1 runner-up)

ATP Challenger and ITF Futures finals

Singles: 35 (23–12)

Doubles: 37 (17 titles, 20 runners-up)

Davis Cup

Singles performances (28–8)

Doubles performances (13-9)

Best Grand Slam results details

Record against other players

Record against top 10 players
Albot's record against players that have been in the ATP top 10, with active players in bold.

|-bgcolor=efefef class="sortbottom"
|align=left|Number 1 ranked players||colspan=9|

|-bgcolor=efefef class="sortbottom"
|align=left|Number 3 ranked players||colspan=9|

|-bgcolor=efefef class="sortbottom"
|align=left|Number 4 ranked players||colspan=9|

|-bgcolor=efefef class="sortbottom"
|align=left|Number 5 ranked players||colspan=9|

|-bgcolor=efefef class="sortbottom"
|align=left|Number 6 ranked players||colspan=9|

|-bgcolor=efefef class="sortbottom"
|align=left|Number 7 ranked players||colspan=9|

|-bgcolor=efefef class="sortbottom"
|align=left|Number 8 ranked players||colspan=9|

|-bgcolor=efefef class="sortbottom"
|align=left|Number 9 ranked players||colspan=9|

|-bgcolor=efefef class="sortbottom"
|align=left|Number 10 ranked players||colspan=9|

Notes

References

External links

 
 
 
 
 
 
 

1989 births
Living people
Sportspeople from Chișinău
Moldovan expatriates in Germany
Moldovan male tennis players
Tennis players at the 2016 Summer Olympics
Olympic tennis players of Moldova